Juan Pablo Vilela Tavares (born 25 April 2002), simply known as Juan, is a Brazilian professional footballer who plays as a left back for Paysandu.

Club career
Born in Brasília, Federal District, Juan joined Goiás' youth setup in 2016, from Atlético Mineiro. He made his first team – and Série A – debut on 15 May 2022, coming on as a late substitute for Diego in a 1–0 home win over Santos.

Career statistics

References

External links
 Futebol de Goyaz profile 

2002 births
Living people
Footballers from Brasília
Brazilian footballers
Association football defenders
Campeonato Brasileiro Série A players
Goiás Esporte Clube players